The Sunshine Plaza Outlet is an outlet shopping mall located in Central District, Taichung, Taiwan and officially opened in May 2008.

Transportation
The mall is accessible by walking distance from Taichung railway station.

See also
 List of tourist attractions in Taiwan
 Lihpao Outlet Mall

References

External links

2008 establishments in Taiwan
Outlet malls in Taiwan
Shopping malls in Taichung
Shopping malls established in 2008